Wayne Alphonso Brady (born June 2, 1972) is an American television personality, comedian, actor, and singer. He is a regular on the American version of the improvisational comedy television series Whose Line Is It Anyway? He was the host of the daytime talk show The Wayne Brady Show, was the original host of Fox's Don't Forget the Lyrics!, and has hosted Let's Make a Deal since its 2009 revival. Brady also performed in the Tony Award–winning musical Kinky Boots on Broadway as Simon—who is also drag queen Lola—from November 2015 to March 2016, and as James Stinson on the American TV series How I Met Your Mother.

Brady is a five-time Emmy Award winner, winning his first for his work on Whose Line? in 2003, two more in the next year for The Wayne Brady Show, and two for Let's Make a Deal. He was also nominated for a Grammy Award in 2009 for Best Traditional R&B Vocal Performance, for his cover of the Sam Cooke song "A Change Is Gonna Come".

Early life 
Brady was born in Columbus, Georgia, to West Indian parents. He was moved to Orlando, Florida, as a young child to live with his grandmother and aunt. Brady refers to his grandmother, Valerie Petersen, as his "mom", since she raised him. As a child, Brady developed a stutter. This led to him being bullied by other children, which caused him a great deal of anxiety.

At 16, Brady started performing in community theater and in the Orlando improvisation troupe SAK Comedy Lab, where he first started developing his improv skills. He attended Dr. Phillips High School in Orlando, from which he graduated in 1989. In 1996, he moved to Los Angeles, where he continued developing his acting skills.

Career 

Brady first appeared on national television as a recurring contestant on the sketch comedy competition Kwik Witz from 1996 to 1999, appearing most often as partners with Frank Maciel. Brady was one of the improvisational theater performers in the original (British) version of Whose Line Is It Anyway?, along with Ryan Stiles, Colin Mochrie, and host Clive Anderson in 1998 when the last season was filmed in Hollywood, after which he became a regular on the American version, hosted by Drew Carey, which was his first stateside television exposure.

In 2003, Brady won a Primetime Emmy Award for Outstanding Individual Performance in a Variety or Music Program for his work on the show, the only person to win the award for a television series, as opposed to a special, since Dana Carvey in 1993.

He went on to star in his own ABC variety show in 2001, The Wayne Brady Show, and a daytime talk show of the same name in 2002, which lasted two seasons and won four Daytime Emmy Awards, two of which went to Brady for Outstanding Talk Show Host. Brady guest-starred on The Drew Carey Show in 1999 and 2000 to take part in "Drew Live" and "Drew Live II". On the show, Brady played several games taken from Whose Line Is It Anyway? with other characters.

In 2004, Brady joined the Broadway revival of Chicago, playing the role of lawyer Billy Flynn. He appeared briefly in the final episode of the 2004 season of the comedy Reno 911!. He guest-starred on the Sci Fi Channel's hit series Stargate SG-1 as Trelak, the first prime of Goa'uld System Lord Ares. He made an appearance on Chappelle's Show, poking fun at his squeaky-clean persona.

Brady wrote and sang the theme song for Disney's animated series The Weekenders. In 2005, he sang and recorded Jim Brickman's original Disney song "Beautiful" (a cover of All-4-One's 2002 hit "Beautiful As You") and its Christmas version.

In 2006, Brady became the host of TV Land's That's What I'm Talking About, a talk show discussing the role of African-Americans in the entertainment industry. From August 29 to September 29, 2006, Brady hosted the Fox show Celebrity Duets.

Brady made several guest appearances on the CBS sitcom How I Met Your Mother, playing James Stinson, the gay brother of Neil Patrick Harris's character, Barney Stinson. Brady has also appeared as a guest star for the MTV show Wild 'N Out and lent his voice to the Adult Swim show Robot Chicken.

Brady guest-starred in the CBC comedy Getting Along Famously alongside his Whose Line is It Anyway? costar Colin Mochrie. He appeared on the episode "You Don't Know Jack" of the television show Dirt and guest-starred on 30 Rock as Steven Black, Liz Lemon's date for the Source Awards. He co-hosted the short-lived VH1 show Vinyl Justice in 1998. In 2007, he starred in the ABC Family film The List. He starred in Flirt, a comedy pilot which was not picked up by the network.

Brady guest-starred as Julius Rock's gifted younger brother, Louis, in the sitcom Everybody Hates Chris, and hosted a singing game show called Don't Forget the Lyrics! on Fox until its cancellation in June 2009. He performed "Wayne Brady: Making $%!^ Up" at the Venetian Hotel in Las Vegas, Nevada four nights a week.

He appeared on two episodes of Kevin Hill. Brady's debut album was released on September 16, 2008. Brady's version of Sam Cooke's "A Change is Gonna Come" earned him a Grammy Award nomination in the Best Traditional R&B Vocal Performance category.

Brady started hosting an updated version of the game show Let's Make a Deal for CBS in October 2009, which taped at the Tropicana Resort and Casino in Las Vegas and currently tapes in Los Angeles. The show replaced the soap opera Guiding Light, which ended its long run. The original host of Let's Make a Deal was Monty Hall, who served as consultant for the new show until his death in 2017. Drew Carey currently hosts The Price Is Right, and thus, both game shows in the CBS daytime lineup (as of September 2019) hold the distinction of being hosted by an alumnus of Whose Line Is It Anyway?

Brady was the guest host on the May 3, 2010, episode of WWE Raw, where he was involved in an in-ring segment with Edge and Randy Orton, eventually getting RKO'd by Orton. Later that year, in August, Brady played Tom Collins in a staged production of Rent at the Hollywood Bowl. The production was directed by Neil Patrick Harris.

Brady appeared alongside Let's Make a Deal announcer Jonathan Mangum in two episodes of Fast and Loose, an improvisational series on BBC2 hosted by Hugh Dennis, in January 2011. Then, with Holly Robinson Peete, he co-hosted the 42nd annual NAACP Image Awards on March 4, 2011.

On May 3, 2011, he appeared on Dancing With The Stars as the lead performer in a tribute to James Brown, celebrating what would have been Brown's 78th birthday in the Macy's Stars of Dance segment. He has also been a special guest of Drew Carey's Improv-A-Ganza on GSN.

Brady made a cameo in the 2011 song "Dedication To My Ex (Miss That)" by Lloyd featuring Lil Wayne and Andre 3000, narrating Lil Wayne's section of the song. He appeared as a special guest star in the March 14, 2012, episode of the TV series Psych.

Brady starred in the 2012 ABC improvisational comedy series Trust Us with Your Life and returned for The CW's revival of Whose Line Is It Anyway? in the summer of 2013.

Brady guest-starred as Don in the Phineas and Ferb episode "Where's Pinky?" on June 7, 2013, and from February 9 to 13, 2015, guest-hosted The Late Late Show on CBS.

In November 2015, Brady replaced Billy Porter as Lola in Kinky Boots on Broadway until March 2016.

Brady assumed the lead role of Aaron Burr in the PrivateBank Theatre production of Hamilton in Chicago from January 17 to April 9, 2017.

In 2018, Brady began a recurring role in the sci-fi drama Colony as Everett Kynes, the administrator of the Seattle colony and creator of an algorithm used in sorting and identifying people.

On April 29, 2018, Brady won the Daytime Emmy Award for Outstanding Game Show Host for Let's Make A Deal for the first time, after seven previous nominations.

In November 2018, Brady began making appearances as Dr. Reese Buckingham on The Bold and the Beautiful.

On October 10, 2019, he was featured in a 30-minute YouTube documentary created by SoulPancake in collaboration with Funny or Die wherein a variety of comedians discuss mental health called Laughing Matters.

On December 18, 2019, Brady competed on season two of The Masked Singer as "Fox". He was named the winner of that season.

Beginning in 2020, Brady plays a major recurring role during the third season of The CW superhero drama series Black Lightning as the DC Comics character Tyson Sykes / Gravedigger. It was also announced that he had created a reality competition show to air on BYU TV called Wayne Brady's Comedy IQ, in which teens would be taught skills and compete in weekly challenges.

Brady later appeared as a guest panelist in season four of The Masked Singer where he also sang Maroon 5's "Memories" as "Mr. TV" at the start of the sixth episode.

On December 28, 2020, it was announced that Brady would star as Django in a benefit concert presentation of Ratatouille the Musical, an internet meme that originated on TikTok, inspired by the 2007 Disney/Pixar film. The concert streamed exclusively on TodayTix on January 1, 2021, and raised over $1 million for The Actors Fund.

On September 8, 2022, Brady was announced as a contestant on season 31 of Dancing with the Stars. He was partnered with Witney Carson and they finished in 3rd place.

Personal life 

Brady has been married twice. He married Diana Lasso on December 31, 1993. They divorced on September 21, 1995. On April 3, 1999, he married dancer Mandie Taketa. He and Taketa have one child, a daughter named Maile Masako Brady, born on February 3, 2003. Brady and Taketa separated on April 5, 2006, and Taketa filed for divorce on July 2, 2007.

In 2007, Brady became an official supporter of Ronald McDonald House Charities and is a member of their celebrity board, the Friends of RMHC.

In 2013, Bill Maher compared Brady to President Barack Obama, in that, in popular culture, they were both supposedly "not black enough". Brady took issue with this statement, suggesting that Maher should "be careful when [he makes] statements like that" because it will allow his viewers to make the same stereotypical assumptions about black people.

Brady has suffered from clinical depression. On his 42nd birthday, in 2014, he had a mental breakdown and later credited Taketa for helping him recover.

Brady is an honorary member of the Phi Beta Sigma fraternity.

Filmography

Film

Television

Video games

Music videos

Theater

Discography 

Albums

Singles
 2000
 "The Weekenders" Theme Song
 2004
 "Unsung Heroes"
 "Between"Wayne Brady with The Sesame Street Muppets
 2005
 "Beautiful"Wayne Brady, accompanied on piano by songwriter Jim Brickman
 "Don't Stop"Jamie Jones featuring Wayne Brady and William Carthright
 2008
 "Ordinary"
 2009
 "F.W.B."
 2013
 "Whistle While I Work it"Chester See featuring Tobuscus with Wayne Brady
 2019
 "Flirtin' With Forever"

Awards and nominations

References

Further reading

External links 

 
 
 
 
 
  Interview.

1972 births
Living people
20th-century American comedians
20th-century American male actors
21st-century American comedians
21st-century American male actors
Actors from Columbus, Georgia
African-American game show hosts
African-American male actors
African-American male comedians
African-American male singers
African-American television personalities
African-American television talk show hosts
American comedy musicians
American game show hosts
American male comedians
American male film actors
American male musical theatre actors
American male singers
American male television actors
Masked Singer winners
American male video game actors
American male voice actors
American television talk show hosts
American tenors
Comedians from Georgia (U.S. state)
Daytime Emmy Award for Outstanding Talk Show Host winners
Dr. Phillips High School alumni
Let's Make a Deal
Male actors from Georgia (U.S. state)
Male actors from Orlando, Florida
Primetime Emmy Award winners
Walt Disney Records artists